The following is a list of female film score composers.

 Anita Andreis, Croatian
 Rachita Arora, Indian
 Malini Awasthi, Indian 
 Lesley Barber (born 1962), Canadian
 Elsa Barraine (1910–1999), French
 Bebe Barron (born 1926), American
 P. Bhanumathi (1925-2005), Indian
 Bhavatharini, Indian 
 Björk (born 1965), Icelandic
 Kathryn Bostic, American
 Joanna Bruzdowicz (born 1943), Polish
 Wendy Carlos (born 1939), American
 Doreen Carwithen (1922–2003), British
 Suzanne Ciani (born 1946), American
 Dolores Claman (1927–2021), Canadian
 Siobhán Cleary (born 1970), Irish
 Lisa Coleman (born 1960), American
 Miriam Cutler, American
 Evelyne Datl, Canadian
 Alokananda Dasgupta, Indian
 Anne-Kathrin Dern (born 1987), German
 Payal Dev, Indian
 Saraswati Devi, Indian
 Sussan Deyhim (born 1958), Iranian
 Michelle DiBucci (born 1961), American
 Violeta Dinescu (born 1953), Romanian
 Elizabeth Drake, Australian
 Anne Dudley (born 1956), English
 Sharon Farber, Israeli
 Samantha Fonti (born 1973), Australian
 Felicity Fox, Australian
 Germaine Franco, American
 Lisa Gerrard (born 1961), Australian
 Julie Giroux (born 1961), American
 Sofia Gubaidulina (born 1931), Russian
 Hildur Guðnadóttir (born 1982), Icelandic
 Dulcie Holland (1913–2000), Australian
 Natalie Holt, British
 Jaddan Bai, Indian 
 Yoko Kanno (born 1963), Japanese
 Kanika Kapoor, Indian/British 
 Eleni Karaindrou (born 1941), Greek
 Laura Karpman (born 1959), American
 Shibani Kashyap, Indian 
 Elena Kats-Chernin, (born 1957), Australian
 Victoria Kelly, New Zealand
 Usha Khanna, Indian
 Sneha Khanwalkar, Indian 
 Morgan Kibby (born 1984), American
 Samira Koppikar, Indian
 Penka Kouneva (born 1967), Bulgarian-American
 Vivian Kubrick (born 1960), American
 Runa Laila (born 1952), Bangladeshi
 Gowry Lekshmi (born 1993), Indian
 Mica Levi, British
 Deborah Lurie (born 1974), American
 Elisabeth Lutyens (1906–1983), English
 Lata Mangeshkar (1929–2022), Indian
 Meena Mangeshkar (born 1931), Indian
 Noriko Matsueda (born 1971), Japanese
 Wendy Melvoin (born 1964), American
 Nami Melumad (born 1988), Israeli-Dutch
 Anna Meredith (born 1978), Scottish
 Angela Morley (1924–2009), English
 Rika Muranaka, Japanese
 Jennie Muskett, British
 Selma Mutal, Franco-Dutch
 Olga Neuwirth (born 1968), Austrian
 Nora Orlandi (born 1933), Italian
 Michiru Ōshima, Japanese
 Christine Ott (born 1963), French
 Starr Parodi, American
 Jocelyn Pook (born 1960), English
 Rachel Portman (born 1960), English
 Ferdousi Rahman (born 1941), Bangladeshi 
 A. R. Reihana, Indian 
 Diana Ringo (born 1992), Finnish
 Lolita Ritmanis (born 1962), Latvian-American
 Ann Ronell (1905–1993), American
 Laura Rossi, British
 Jasleen Royal, Indian 
 Sandrine Rudaz, Swiss French
 Sarah Schachner (born 1988), American
 Gaili Schoen, American
 Michelle Scullion (born 1957), New Zealand
 Ilona Sekacz (born 1948), British
 Neeta Sen, Indian 
 Anoushka Shankar, Indian/American
 Chitra Singh, Indian 
 Maribeth Solomon (born 1950), Canadian
 Laurie Spiegel (born 1945), American
 M. M. Srilekha, Indian
 Peggy Stuart Coolidge (1913–1981), American
 Meenakshi Subramanyam, Indian
 Germaine Tailleferre (1892–1983), French
 Parampara Thakur, Indian 
 Katia Tchemberdji (born 1960), Russian
 Jennifer Thomas (pianist) (born 1977), American
Beatrice Thiriet (born 1960)
 Pinar Toprak (born 1980), Turkish-American
 Nerida Tyson-Chew (born 1965), Australian
 Shirley Walker (1945–2006), American
 Amelia Warner (born 1982), English
 Debbie Wiseman (born 1963), British
 Jill Wisoff (born 1956), American
 Caitlin Yeo, Australian
 Shimul Yousuf, Bangladeshi

Women film score composers
Female film
Lists of women by occupation